The 2013 Aragon motorcycle Grand Prix was the fourteenth round of the 2013 MotoGP season. It was held at the Ciudad del Motor de Aragón in Alcañiz on 29 September 2013.

Classification

MotoGP

Moto2

Moto3

Championship standings after the race (MotoGP)
Below are the standings for the top five riders and constructors after round fourteen has concluded.

Riders' Championship standings

Constructors' Championship standings

 Note: Only the top five positions are included for both sets of standings.

References

Aragon motorcycle Grand Prix
Aragon
Aragon
Aragon motorcycle Grand Prix